Hours After is an album by American composer, bandleader and keyboardist Sun Ra recorded in 1986 in Italy and released on the Black Saint label in 1989. The album was recorded at the same sessions the produced Reflections in Blue which was released in 1987.

Reception
The Allmusic review by Scott Yanow awarded the album 4 stars and stated "On this continually interesting program, Sun Ra and his Arkestra perform typically odd versions of a couple of standards, a swinging original, and two outside pieces. Almost up to the level of Reflections In Blue (recorded during the same two-day period), this date features one of the stronger versions of Ra's band... Recommended.".

Track listing
All compositions by Sun Ra except as indicated
 "But Not for Me" (George Gershwin, Ira Gershwin) - 5:58  
 "Hours After" - 8:42  
 "Beautiful Love" (Haven Gillespie, Wayne King, Egbert Van Alstyne, Victor Young) - 4:59  
 "Dance of the Extra Terrestrians" - 13:21  
 "Love on a Far Away Planet" - 10:05
Recorded at Jingle Machine Studio, Milano, on December 18 and 19, 1986.

Personnel
Sun Ra - piano, synthesizer, vocals
Randall Murray - trumpet
Tyrone Hill - trombone
Pat Patrick - alto saxophone, clarinet
Marshall Allen - alto saxophone, flute, piccolo, oboe
Danny Ray Thompson - alto saxophone, baritone saxophone, flute, bongos
John Gilmore - tenor saxophone, clarinet, timbales
Eloe Omoe - alto saxophone, alto clarinet, bass clarinet
James Jacson - bassoon, Ancient Egyptian Infinity Drum
Ronald Wilson - tenor saxophone
Carl LeBlanc - electric guitar
Tyler Mitchell - bass
Thomas Hunter, Earl "Buster" Smith - drums

References

Black Saint/Soul Note albums
Sun Ra albums
1989 albums